Leucanopsis calvona is a moth of the family Erebidae. It was described by William Schaus in 1941. It is found in Brazil and Paraguay.

References

calvona
Moths described in 1941